HMS Vampire was a V-class submarine of the Royal Navy (RN).

The boat was laid down by Vickers-Armstrong at Barrow-in-Furness on 9 November 1942. She was launched on 20 July 1943, and commissioned into the RN on 13 November 1943.

The submarine operated during the late stages of World War II, and earned the battle honour "Aegean 1944". The submarine was decommissioned after the war in September 1945 and was broken up for scrap at Gateshead in March 1950

Notes

References
 
 

 

British V-class submarines
Ships built in Barrow-in-Furness
1943 ships